"That Ain't No Way To Go" is a song co-written and recorded by American country music duo Brooks & Dunn.  It was released in March 1994 the fifth and final single from their album Hard Workin' Man.  The song reached the top of the Billboard Hot Country Singles & Tracks (now Hot Country Songs) chart.  It was written by Kix Brooks, Don Cook and Ronnie Dunn.

Music video
The music video was directed by Piers Plowden and premiered in April 1994 and was aired on CMT and GAC.

Cover versions
Country music singer Tim McGraw covered the song from The Last Rodeo Tour

Chart performance
The song debuted at number 55 on the Hot Country Singles & Tracks chart dated April 9, 1994. It charted for 20 weeks on that chart, and reached Number One on the chart dated June 11, 1994, holding the top spot for one week, and becoming the duo's sixth Number One single.

Charts

Year-end charts

References

1994 singles
1993 songs
Country ballads
Brooks & Dunn songs
Songs written by Ronnie Dunn
Songs written by Kix Brooks
Songs written by Don Cook
Song recordings produced by Scott Hendricks
Song recordings produced by Don Cook
Arista Nashville singles